The  Nonsan–Cheonan Expressway is an expressway serving the South Chungcheong region in South Korea. It connects Nonsan on the Gyeongbu Expressway to Cheonan on the Honam Expressway.  The freeway's route number is 25, which it shares with the Honam Expressway.

List of facilities

IC: Interchange, JC: Junction, SA: Service Area, TG:Tollgate

See also
 Roads and expressways in South Korea
 Transportation in South Korea

References

External links 
 MOLIT South Korean Government Transport Department

 
Expressways in South Korea
Cheonan
Nonsan
Roads in South Chungcheong